
Gmina Wolin is an urban-rural gmina (administrative district) in Kamień County, West Pomeranian Voivodeship, in north-western Poland.

Villages
Apart from the town of Wolin, Gmina Wolin contains the villages and settlements of Chynowo, Dargobądz, Darzowice, Dobropole, Domysłów, Dramino, Gogolice, Jagienki, Jagniątkowo, Jarzębowo, Karnocice, Kodrąb, Kodrąbek, Kołczewo, Koniewo, Korzęcin, Ładzin, Laska, Łojszyno, Łuskowo, Mierzęcin, Mokrzyca Mała, Mokrzyca Wielka, Ostromice, Parłowo, Piaski Wielkie, Płocin, Rabiąż, Recław, Rekowo, Rzeczyn, Sierosław, Siniechowo, Skoszewo, Strzegowo, Sułomino, Świętouść, Troszyn, Troszynek, Unin, Warnowo, Wartowo, Wiejkówko, Wiejkowo, Wisełka, Zagórze, Zastań and Żółwino.

Neighbouring gminas
Gmina Wolin is bordered by the gminas of Dziwnów, Golczewo, Kamień Pomorski, Międzyzdroje, Przybiernów and Stepnica.

References
Polish official population figures 2006

Wolin
Kamień County